The lineated woodcreeper has been split into the following species:

Guianan woodcreeper, Lepidocolaptes albolineatus
Duida woodcreeper, Lepidocolaptes duidae
Inambari woodcreeper, Lepidocolaptes fatimalimae
Dusky-capped woodcreeper, Lepidocolaptes fuscicapillus

Birds by common name